The 2012 Viccourt Cup was a professional tennis tournament played on outdoor hard courts. It was the 1st edition of the tournament and was part of the 2012 ITF Women's Circuit. It took place in Donetsk, Ukraine, between 16 and 22 July 2012.

WTA entrants

Seeds

 Rankings are as of 9 July 2012.

Other entrants
The following players received wildcards into the singles main draw:
  Anastasiya Fedoryshyn
  Oksana Koshman
  Valeriya Strakhova
  Taisiya Zakarlyuk

The following players received entry from the qualifying draw:
  Diana Bogoliy
  Anna Koval
  Ganna Poznikhirenko
  Ekaterina Pushkareva

Champions

Singles

  Vesna Dolonc def.  Maria João Koehler, 6–2, 6–3

Doubles

  Lyudmyla Kichenok /  Nadiia Kichenok def.  Valentyna Ivakhnenko /  Kateryna Kozlova, 6–2, 7–5

External links
 Official website
 ITF website

Viccourt Cup
2012 in Ukrainian sport
Viccourt Cup